Steatonyssus is a genus of bat and bird mites in the family Macronyssidae. There are about eight described species in Steatonyssus.

Species
These eight species belong to the genus Steatonyssus:
 Steatonyssus brucei
 Steatonyssus heteroventralis
 Steatonyssus musculi (Schrank, 1803)
 Steatonyssus nakazimai Asanuma & Uchikawa, 1977
 Steatonyssus occidentalis (Ewing, 1933)
 Steatonyssus periblepharus Kolenati, 1858
 Steatonyssus spinosus Willmann, 1936
 Steatonyssus surinamensis

References

Mesostigmata
Articles created by Qbugbot
Parasites of bats